Sundsbø is a Norwegian surname. Notable people with the surname include:

Dagfinn Sundsbø (born 1946), Norwegian politician 
Sølve Sundsbø (born 1970), Norwegian fashion photographer
Svein Sundsbø (born 1943), Norwegian businessman and politician

Norwegian-language surnames